RNA binding motif protein 47 is a protein in humans that is encoded by the RBM47 gene in chromosome 4.

Model organisms
Model organisms have been used in the study of RBM47 function. A conditional knockout mouse line called Rbm47tm1a(EUCOMM)Wtsi was generated at the Wellcome Trust Sanger Institute. Male and female animals underwent a standardized phenotypic screen to determine the effects of deletion. Additional screens performed:  - In-depth immunological phenotyping

References

Further reading 

Genes on human chromosome 4
Human proteins